was a province of Japan located in what is today part of western Mie Prefecture. Iga is classified as one of the provinces of the Tōkaidō. Under the Engishiki classification system, Iga was ranked as an "inferior country" ( gekoku) and a "near country" ( kingoku). 

Iga was bordered by Ise to the east and south, Ōmi to the north, Yamato to the west and south, and Yamashiro Province to the northwest. It roughly coincides with the modern municipalities of Iga and Nabari in Mie Prefecture. Surrounded by mountains, historically, Iga Province was rather inaccessible due to extremely poor road conditions. However, the area is now relatively easy to access from nearby Nara and Kyoto, as well as the larger cities of Osaka and Nagoya.

History

Asuka period
Iga was separated from Ise Province during the Asuka period, around 680 AD. The provincial capital was located in what is now part of the city of Iga, along with the ruins of the Iga Kokubun-ji. The Ichinomiya of the province is the Aekuni Shrine, which is also located in what is now part of the city of Iga.

Heian, Kamakura and Muromachi periods
Little is known of the subsequent history of the province during the Heian and Kamakura periods. However, by the early Muromachi period, Iga became effectively independent from its nominal feudal rulers and established a form of republic. During this period, Iga came to be known as a center for ninjutsu, claiming (along with Kōka in what is now Shiga Prefecture) to being one of the birthplaces of the ninja clans.

In 1581, two years after a failed invasion led by his son, the warlord Oda Nobunaga launched a massive invasion of Iga, attacking from six directions with a force of 40,000 to 60,000 men which effectively destroyed the political power of the ninja (see the Tenshō Iga War).

Tokugawa shogunate
With the establishment of the Tokugawa shogunate, Iga was briefly (1600–1608) under the control of Iga-Ueno Domain, a 200,000-koku han during the rule of Tsutsui Sadatsugu, a former retainer of Toyotomi Hideyoshi. However, the Tsutsui clan was dispossessed in 1608, and the territory of the domain was given to Tōdō Takatora, the daimyō of Tsu Domain. It remained a part of Tsu Domain until the Meiji Restoration.

Edo period
Notable Edo-period people from Iga included the famous samurai Hattori Hanzō and the haiku poet Matsuo Bashō. Iga Ueno Castle was retained by Tsu Domain as a secondary administrative center for the western portion of the domain.

Mie Prefecture
After the abolition of the han system in July 1871, Tsu Domain became "Tsu Prefecture", which later became part of Mie Prefecture.

Historical districts
Iga was divided into 4 Districts (郡), which were further subdivided into 197 villages. The total assessed value of the province in terms of kokudaka was 110,843 koku.
 Ahai District – merged with Yamada District to become Ayama District (阿山郡) on March 29, 1896
 Iga District – merged with Nabari District to become Naga District (名賀郡) on March 29, 1896
 Nabari District – merged with Iga District to become Naga District on March 29, 1896
 Yamada District – merged with Ahai District to become Ayama District on March 29, 1896

See also
 Iga-ryū, the Iga Ninja school of ninjutsu

Notes

References
 Nussbaum, Louis-Frédéric and Käthe Roth. (2005).  Japan encyclopedia. Cambridge: Harvard University Press. ;  OCLC 58053128
 Titsingh, Isaac. (1834).  Annales des empereurs du Japon (Nihon Ōdai Ichiran).  Paris: Royal Asiatic Society, Oriental Translation Fund of Great Britain and Ireland. OCLC 5850691.

External links 

  Murdoch's map of provinces, 1903
 Iga Province Ninja History 

History of Mie Prefecture
Former provinces of Japan
Tokaido (region)